Catch the Fair One is a 2021 American thriller film written, directed, and produced by Josef Kubota Wladyka, based on a story by Wladyka and Kali Reis. It stars Reis, Daniel Henshall, Tiffany Chu, Michael Drayer, Lisa Emery, Kimberly Guerrero, and Kevin Dunn. The plot follows a young Native American woman and former boxer named Kaylee who voluntarily joins a sex trafficking ring to find her missing younger sister. The film premiered at the Tribeca Film Festival on June 12, 2021. It was released in the United States on February 11, 2022, by IFC Films. The film was met with critical acclaim, with praise aimed towards the story and performances. At the 37th Independent Spirit Awards, Reis received a nomination for Best Female Lead.

Plot
Kaylee, a Native American woman who was once a boxer, is now an addict living in a shelter and working as a waitress. Some time ago, Kaylee's younger sister Weeta was kidnapped and taken into a sex trafficking ring. She is one of the hundreds of young girls who go missing every year. No one has heard of her since. Kaylee is still searching.

After finding a lead on Weeta's whereabouts, Kaylee meets the procurer of a local trafficking ring. The man takes pictures of her, drugs her, masturbates in front of her, and tells her that she will be sent to a man looking to buy a "Native girl".

Bobby is the son of the ring's kingpin, Willie. Kaylee is chloroformed, tied up, and taken by Bobby to the buyer's home. She wakes up alone in a basement and using a razor blade hidden under her tongue, she cuts herself free. Once Bobby and the buyer arrive, Bobby explains that he knows what she is trying to do and that she will never find her sister. When he leaves the room, and the buyer prepares to rape her, Kaylee pulls out the razor blade, kills the buyer, and runs away. Willie and his crew arrive to get rid of the dead body. Kaylee returns to the house and hides in Bobby's car. She sees Willie hit Bobby and order him to leave.

Bobby goes home to his wife Linda and son Junior. When he leaves the room, Kaylee enters the house and ties his family up, putting tape over their mouths to stop them from screaming. Bobby returns and a fight ensues, with Kaylee using her expertise as a boxer to gain the upper hand. After tying him up, Kaylee demands information about her sister but he refuses to answer. She stabs him in the leg, threatens to cut off Linda's ear, and begins to waterboard him. An uncooperative Bobby drowns to death.

Kaylee interrogates Linda and learns that Willie owns a train yard where he will transport the next "batch" of kidnapped girls. Kaylee arrives at the train yard with only Bobby's gun in her possession. At gunpoint, one of Willie's truck drivers tells her that the girls are in a nearby warehouse. She finds them and tells them to escape when the procurer from before spots her. He runs away and Kaylee shoots him several times. She questions him but he begins to apologize and beg instead. Kaylee walks away, letting the procurer bleed to death. Kaylee reveals that she has hidden Linda and Junior in her car. She orders Linda to take him to Willie, who lives in a mansion.

Inside the house, Linda is greeted by Willie's wife Debra, who says Willie is in the library. She mentions that Linda regularly visited them every time Bobby became aggressive. In the bathroom, Linda messages Kaylee with the correct information about where Willie is but also calls 9-1-1 before leaving. Kaylee holds Willie at gunpoint and asks about Weeta. Debra barges into the room with a gun and accidentally shoots Willie in the face. Kaylee shoots and kills Debra as Debra shoots again, hitting Kaylee in the stomach. In her final moments, Kaylee imagines what her life would have been if she had succeeded, as she envisions herself entering her comeback boxing match.

Cast
 Kali Reis as Kaylee
 Daniel Henshall as Bobby
 Tiffany Chu as Linda
 Michael Drayer as Danny
 Lisa Emery as Debra
 Kimberly Guerrero as Jaya
 Kevin Dunn as Willie
 Isabelle Chester as Lisa
 Sam Seward as Jeremiah
 Mainaku Borrero as Weeta
 Wesley Leung as Bobby Jr.

Production
Catch the Fair One was shot in Buffalo, New York, with Ross Giardina serving as cinematographer. The film was executive produced by Darren Aronofsky. It is the acting debut of professional boxer Kali Reis, who is active in the Missing and Murdered Indigenous Women (MMWIG) movement. The film is dedicated to sound mixer Michael Wolf Snyder, who died by suicide at the age of 35.

Release
The film had its world premiere at the Tribeca Film Festival on June 12, 2021. By the end of its run, the film screened at festivals in Deauville, Jerusalem, San Diego, Warsaw, and Woodstock. In August 2021, IFC Films bought the film's distribution rights. The film was released in the United States on February 11, 2022. In April 2022, IFC Films signed an output deal with AMC+. The film is set to be released on the streaming service on May 13, 2022.

Reception

Box office
In the United States and Canada, the film earned $7,992 from thirty theaters in its opening weekend. It made $8,625 from eight theaters in its second weekend, and $6,397 from three theaters in its third, $295 from one theater in its fourth, $244 from two theaters in its fifth, and $210 from two theaters in its sixth.

Critical response
 

Screen Rants Mae Abdulbaki said the film was "strongest in action mode". Nick Schager of The Daily Beast praised the film for its "portrait of white men exploiting Native American women for profit and sexual gratification", adding that "[it] isn't lost on the film..." David Ehrlich from IndieWire said "[t]here isn't much for Catch the Fair One to find at the end of the line, but it looks for its invisible women - indigenous and otherwise - with the urgency of someone who knows what seeing them would actually mean".

Accolades
Catch the Fair One competed for Best Film at festivals in Deauville, and Warsaw, and won the award at the Sidewalk and Tribeca Film Festivals. Reis won Best Actress at the Newport Beach Film Festival, and received a nomination in the same category at the 37th Independent Spirit Awards.

References

External links

American thriller films
Films produced by Darren Aronofsky
Protozoa Pictures films
2021 thriller films
2020s English-language films
Films about human trafficking in the United States
American films about revenge
IFC Films films
2022 independent films
Films about Native Americans
Films about child abduction in the United States
2020s American films